Michał Butkiewicz (born 18 August 1942) is a Polish fencer. He won a bronze medal in the team épée event at the 1968 Summer Olympics.

References

1942 births
Living people
Polish male fencers
Olympic fencers of Poland
Fencers at the 1968 Summer Olympics
Olympic bronze medalists for Poland
Olympic medalists in fencing
Fencers from Warsaw
Medalists at the 1968 Summer Olympics
21st-century Polish people
20th-century Polish people